Arques may refer to the following places in France:

 Arques, Aude, in the Aude department
 Arques, Aveyron, in the Aveyron department
 Arques, Pas-de-Calais, in the Pas-de-Calais department
 Arques-la-Bataille, in the Seine-Maritime department, along the Arques River
 Battle of Arques (1589)
 Arques (river), a river in the Seine-Maritime department of northern France